San Juan Bautista is a municipality in the Suchitepéquez department of Guatemala.

Municipalities of the Suchitepéquez Department